La bestia magnífica (Lucha libre) ("The Magnificent Beast (Wrestling)") is a 1953 Mexican film directed by Chano Urueta. It tells the story of two  good friends who become wrestlers to leave poverty behind, but the arrival of an ambitious woman will tragically change their destiny.

Director Urueta was so enthusiastic about the project that he filmed three fights in their entirety, and the final cut came to 128 minutes, which was very unusual in the Mexican film industry. The production is regarded as the film that started the genre of "wrestling movies", which became immensely popular in Mexico for many decades.

José Elías Moreno won the Ariel Award for Best Supporting Actor and Jorge Bustos for Best Film Editing.

Cast

Crox Alvarado: David
Wolf Ruvinskis: Carlos
José Elías Moreno:'Maravilla' López
Irma Dorantes: Teresita
Miguel Manzano: Benjamín Aguilar
José Luis Rojas: Luis Rojas
Ismael Pérez: Poncianito
Enrique Llanes: Wrestler
Rito Romero: Wrestler
Miroslava: Meche

External links
 

1953 films
1950s Spanish-language films
Films directed by Chano Urueta
Mexican black-and-white films
1950s Mexican films